Lehri Nature Park is situated in Jhelum District, Punjab, Pakistan. The park is almost 90 kilometres on GT Road in the hilly region from Islamabad and almost 40 kilometers from Jhelum City. It is 10 kilometres from GT Road. The park has lodgings for the night. It is named after the Union Council of the village Lehri. Lehri village is approx 10miles from the park. The residents of Lehri village are mainly the descendants of the Gakhar tribe of the Pothohar region in Pakistan.

It is spread over 17,000 acres and is covered with phulai (Senegalia modesta), sanatha (Dodonaea viscosa) and wild olive.

References

See also
 List of parks and gardens in Pakistan

Jhelum District
Nature parks in Pakistan
Wildlife sanctuaries in Punjab, Pakistan
Wildlife sanctuaries of Pakistan
Protected areas of Punjab, Pakistan